Orelope is a Local Government Area in Oyo State, Nigeria. Its headquarters are in the town of Igboho.

It has an area of 917 km² and a population of 104,441 at the 2006 census.

The postal code of the area is 212.

References

Local Government Areas in Oyo State